Philip Cahn (1894–1984) was an American film editor who edited more than eighty films and television series. He also directed the 1935 film I've Been Around.

Philip Cahn, I. James Wilkinson and Ben Lewis founded The Society of Motion Picture Film Editors in 1937, which was renamed the Motion Picture Editors Guild in 1944.

Philip Cahn was the brother of the director Edward L. Cahn and the father of the editor Dann Cahn.

Selected filmography
 King for a Night (1933)
 I've Been Around (1935)
 The Great Impersonation (1935)
 The Affair of Susan (1935)
 Alias Mary Dow (1935)
 The Girl on the Front Page (1936)
 Girl Overboard (1937)
 Behind the Mike (1937)
 Rio (1939)
 The Big Guy (1939)
 Senorita from the West (1945)
 I Was an American Spy (1951)

References

Bibliography
 Lisa Dombrowski. The Films of Samuel Fuller: If You Die, I’ll Kill You. Wesleyan University Press, 2015.

External links

1894 births
1984 deaths
American film editors
Artists from New York City